is a Prefectural Natural Park in Wakayama Prefecture, Japan. Established in 1956, the park spans the borders of the municipalities of Arida, Hirogawa, and Yuasa.

See also
 National Parks of Japan
 List of Places of Scenic Beauty of Japan (Wakayama)

References

External links
  Map of Nishiarida Prefectural Natural Park

Parks and gardens in Wakayama Prefecture
Arida, Wakayama
Hirogawa, Wakayama
Yuasa, Wakayama
Protected areas established in 1956
1956 establishments in Japan